A Song for ×× (the "××" is silent) is the debut album by Japanese pop artist Ayumi Hamasaki, released January 1, 1999, by Avex Trax. Primarily a rock-pop album, it features musical composition and arrangements by Yasuhiko Hoshino, Mitsuru Igarashi, and others.

"Poker Face" was released as the album's lead single on April 8, 1998. Entering the Oricon chart at number twenty, it became her first charting single. Four further singles were released to promote A Song for ××: "You", "Trust", "For My Dear...", and Depend on You". All of them were top twenty hits in Japan, with the latter three reaching the top ten.

The album debuted atop the Oricon Charts with first week sales of 548,210 copies; it topped the chart for five weeks, a remarkable feat for a debut album. Its high first week sales were partly due to its debut sales being the first and second week sales combined (Oricon only has 51 weeks instead of 52). The album charted for 63 weeks and was certified Million by the Recording Industry Association of Japan for shipments exceeding one million copies in the country. As of 2008, A Song for ×× is Japan's 139th best selling album of all time.

Track listing

Release history

Charts
Oricon Sales Chart (Japan)

 Total sales: 1,610,000 (Japan)
 Total sales: 1,910,000 (Avex)

Singles

Total Single Sales: 775,000

Total Album and Single Sales:  2,385,000

References 

Ayumi Hamasaki albums
1999 debut albums
Avex Group albums
Japanese-language albums